Scleronotus stigosus is a species of beetle in the family Cerambycidae. It was described by Julio in 1998.

References

Acanthoderini
Beetles described in 1998